Bull's-Eye Barbecue Sauce is a barbecue sauce created and distributed by Kraft Heinz in the United States and Canada.  It is also the official BBQ sauce of the Calgary Stampede.

History 
Bulls-Eye was introduced in 1985 with the tag line The Big, Bold Taste of Bulls-Eye can`t be beat. In 2009, Bull's-Eye launched a marketing campaign entitled the Bull's-Eye Brotherhood with a comedic series of web videos featuring Canadian comedian Gerry Dee.

Burger King 
Bulls-Eye was used at Burger King fast food restaurants on their Bulls-Eye BBQ burger, and Rodeo Cheeseburger. It was replaced in 2007 with Sweet Baby Ray's brand sauce.

References

External links
 

Products introduced in 1985
Barbecue sauces
Brand name condiments
Kraft Foods brands
Heinz